The National Lacrosse League (NLL) is a men's professional box lacrosse league in North America. The league is headquartered in Philadelphia, Pennsylvania.

The NLL currently has fifteen teams: ten in the United States and five in Canada. The NLL ranks third in average attendance for pro indoor sports worldwide, behind only the NHL and NBA. Unlike other box lacrosse leagues which play in the summer, the NLL plays its games in the winter and spring, from December to June. Each year, the playoff teams battle for the National Lacrosse League Cup. The NLL has averaged between 8,900 and 10,700 spectators per game each year since 2004.

Box lacrosse rules

The NLL plays four 15-minute quarters with 2-minute breaks between quarters and a 15-minute half-time. At the start of the each quarter and after every goal, players will "face-off" at the center of the field to determine who will get possession. This is done by the two players pushing the heads of their sticks together with the game ball  in the middle. A scrum-like match usually happens when the players on either team try and win the ball. 

If a game is tied after regulation, the two teams play sudden death overtime. Each team may take a 45-second timeout per half. Each team dresses 19 players: 2 goaltenders and 17 "runners". NLL goals are 4'9" wide and 4' tall. 

The NLL uses a 30-second shot clock which is similar to a professional or collegiate basketball shot clock. The clock will start its countdown once one team gets possession of the ball. If the offense does not shoot the ball in time, they lose possession. However, if the offense shoots on goal and then re-retrieves the ball then the shot clock is restarted.

Fighting is a 5-minute major penalty and does not result in an automatic ejection.

Season and playoffs

Each team in the NLL plays eighteen games during the regular season, nine each at home and away. The teams are divided into two divisions: the eight-team East and the seven-team West Division. NLL games are typically played on Fridays, Saturdays, and Sundays while some weekends see a team(s) play twice.

The regular season begins in December and ends in April. Starting in 2018, the league announced that the playoffs would be expanded to eight teams to accommodate expansion. For the 2022 playoffs, the top four teams in the East and top three teams in the West automatically qualified. The final playoff spot is awarded to the team with the next best record: the fourth in the West, or the fifth in the East. In 2022, that spot was given to the East's Philadelphia Wings. The first round is single-elimination, and the Conference Finals and Championship rounds are best-of-three.

Players
The NLL adopted a soft salary cap of US$400,000 per team for the 2013 season. The average base salary as of the 2013 season was $19,135. The maximum salary for a franchise player is approximately $34,000.
Most NLL players have full-time jobs off the floor, such as Buffalo's John Tavares, a high school teacher in Mississauga, Ontario. As of 2018, the NLL salary cap was $415,000, with Buffalo Business First reporter Paul Lane citing the following pay scale: 

 Rookies: $10,208
 Second-year players: $12,196-$16,631
 Veteran minimum: $15,165
 Veteran maximum: $30,132
 Franchise player: $37,664
 Average salary: $19,375.21

Although ten of the fifteen teams are based in the U.S., less than 7% of players are Americans. About 83% are Canadians and 10% Iroquois from either Canada or the U.S.

Teams

Current teams

An asterisk (*) denotes the franchise moved to its present location and has been in one or more previous locations in its history.

History

Eagle Pro Box Lacrosse League

The rebirth of major professional box lacrosse in the United States came on March 13, 1986, with the formation of the Eagle Pro Box Lacrosse League (EPBLL), which was incorporated by Russ Cline and Chris Fritz. The "Eagle League" moniker was inspired by a meeting with Iroquois leaders, whose culture views the animal as a tutelary spirit. Previously, in 1985 box lacrosse sponsored an event played at the Spectrum in Philadelphia. The USA/Canada Superseries was an eight-game series seen as a precursor to the Major Indoor Lacrosse League.

The league opened play for the 1987 season with two games on January 10, 1987: the Philadelphia Wings at the New Jersey Saints (Philadelphia defeating New Jersey by 11–8) and the Baltimore Thunder at the Washington Wave. Darrell Russell was named Commissioner of the league.

The four teams contested a six-game regular season before a postseason which saw all four teams qualify for a single knockout tournament which ended with the Baltimore Thunder being crowned as the EPBLL's first champion in 1987. Coached by Bob Griebe, the Baltimore Thunder defeated the Washington Wave by a score of 11–10 to capture the league's first championship.

The league announced that a total of 124,536 fans attended Eagle Pro Box Lacrosse League games in its first season. Those same four teams played in the second season of the EPBLL. The teams expanded to an eight-game schedule, and set up a three-team playoff with the regular season winner claiming a bye to the title game.

1988

The league began its second season with each of the four teams playing an eight-game schedule. The New Jersey Saints became the second league champions by defeating the Washington Wave, 17–16 before 8,125 fans at the Capital Centre. For the Wave, it was the second time in as many years they reached the championship game, only to come away on the short end of a one-goal game.

The league then announced that the Saints would relocate to the Nassau Coliseum on Long Island beginning in the 1989 season. The team name was changed to the New York Saints to reflect their new home. The MILL announced that it would award expansion teams to Detroit, Michigan, and Boston, Massachusetts. The teams began play in the 1989 season. The Detroit team was named the Turbos, and began play in the Joe Louis Arena. Their team colors were announced to be purple, silver and black. The Boston entry was called the New England Blazers and they played their home games at the Worcester Centrum. The Blazers used green, orange, and white as their team colors.

Major Indoor Lacrosse League

1989

Prior to its third campaign, the league changed its name to the more conventional Major Indoor Lacrosse League (MILL), as the spiritual implications of its original name proved too cryptic for most people to understand. The season opened with six teams: the Baltimore Thunder, the Detroit Turbos, the New England Blazers, the New York Saints, the Philadelphia Wings, and the Washington Wave. Each of the six teams played an eight-game schedule in 1989, with an even four home and road games.

In its first ever regular season game, 12,171 Detroit fans watched the expansion Turbos defeat the Washington Wave, 11–9, in the debut of the 1989 season. As the season went on, regular season attendance figures for the league totaled at 230,724 for 24 regular season games, which made an average of 9,614 people in the stands per game. When adding the postseason, the numbers grew to 255,088 total and an average of 9,811 a game.

Later that year, the Philadelphia Wings captured the league championship in front of a record postseason crowd of 16,042 at the Spectrum, defeating the New York Saints, 11–10. After the championship game, the league announced the expansion into Pittsburgh, a team later to be called the Bulls, who played at the Civic Arena, sporting the traditional Pittsburgh colors of black and gold, like the Steelers.

1990

In 1990, the MILL prepared to open its fourth season with six teams: the Baltimore Thunder, Detroit Turbos, New England Blazers, New York Saints, Philadelphia Wings, and Pittsburgh Bulls. Each of the six teams played an eight-game schedule over the 1990 season. During the near of the end of the season, the New York Saints defeated the Philadelphia Wings, 8–5, before the first sellout and the largest crowd in league history: 17,177 at the Spectrum in Philadelphia. The Saints' victory forced a rematch the next week in the playoffs. However, the Wings won that game and later went on to become the first team to win two league championship games, defeating the New England Blazers, 17–7 in front of 11,479 fans.

The Major Indoor Lacrosse League later announced that the attendance for 26 total games during the season was 287,585 which was a huge boost, increasing the average attendance a game to 11,060. After the season, the MILL announced the signing of twin brothers, Paul Gait and Gary Gait, 3-time All-Americans at Syracuse to the Detroit Turbos after being drafted (the two brothers won national championships with the Syracuse Orange in 1988, 1989, and 1990).

1991

The league prepared to open season five with the same six teams. However, this season schedule increased from 8 to 10 games with each team playing five games at home and five games on the road.

In the first game of the regular season, the debut of Detroit rookie twin brothers Paul and Gary Gait was successful, as they paced the Turbos to a 20–16 victory over the Baltimore Thunder.

The 1991 season was definitely a record-breaking year, especially in Detroit. Rookie twin Turbos, Paul and Gary Gait, set new standards in most offensive categories. Paul scored a record 47 goals, while Gary was second in the league with 32. Gary established new records with 36 assists and 68 points. As a team, Detroit set records for goals scored with 184, assists with 227, and total points with 411.

The Detroit Turbos defeated the Baltimore Thunder, 14–12, to claim the league's fifth title and the Turbos' first title. The World Championship Game was attended by 10,814 at the Baltimore Arena.

The league announced that Buffalo had been named as an expansion team for league play in the 1992 season. The team was named the Bandits, wearing the colors black, orange, and white, and had their home in Memorial Auditorium. The league promoted the team in conjunction with the Buffalo Sabres.

Final league attendance numbers for the 1991 season reached 287,654.

On April 20, 1991, the National Division All-Stars defeated the American Division All-Stars, 25–20, in the inaugural League All-Star Game at the Spectrum in Philadelphia.

1992

The league opened the sixth season with seven teams with the expansion Buffalo Bandits joining the league. Each of the seven teams played an eight-game schedule with four home games and four road games.

The Buffalo Bandits defeated the Philadelphia Wings, 20–11, in their first ever sellout of 16,325 in Memorial Auditorium. It marked the second sellout in league history. The Buffalo Bandits defeated the Baltimore Thunder in front of their second sellout crowd of the season at the Memorial Auditorium, 16,325. It also marked the first time a team sold out two games in the same season.

The expansion Buffalo Bandits advanced to the League Championship Game by defeating the Detroit Turbos and the Gait brothers, 19–16, to win the National Division crown. The Philadelphia Wings defeated the Saints, 8–6, to capture the American Division Championship.

For the first time, an expansion team won the league's World Championship, as the Buffalo Bandits defeated the Philadelphia Wings, 11–10, in overtime.

1993

Buffalo won their second consecutive League Championship with a 13–12 comeback victory over the Philadelphia Wings before 16,325 in the sold-out Memorial Auditorium. The Bandits kept their 18-game winning streak alive, the longest in professional sports. Buffalo joined the Wings as the only team in league history to win back-to-back championships.

The League and the Players Association announced a three-year contract agreement and the league signed a six-year agreement with ESPN.

1994

ESPN2's first Monday night broadcast featured the Detroit Turbos against the Baltimore Thunder.

The Philadelphia Wings denied the Buffalo Bandits a third consecutive World Championship by defeating the Bandits, 26–15, in front of a sellout crowd of 16,284 at Memorial Auditorium. The win gave the Wings its third League Championship in their history, the most of any league team. ESPN broadcast the game live from Buffalo, marking the first live telecast by ESPN of a league game.

The league announced that Rochester, New York, would be awarded an expansion team for the 1995 season.

1995

The expansion Rochester Knighthawks won their inaugural game, 12–8, against the New York Saints in the War Memorial.

Philadelphia broke the league's attendance record as 17,380 fans witnessed the Wings defeat of the Baltimore Thunder in the regular season finale.

For the first time in league history, Paul Gait of Rochester played against his twin brother Gary Gait of Philadelphia.

The Philadelphia Wings won back-to-back championships by defeating the Rochester Knighthawks, 15–14, in a thrilling overtime game. As of 1995, the Wings had won four league titles in their nine-year history.

1996

Before the beginning of the 1996 season, the second-to-last season that the NLL would be known as the Major Indoor Lacrosse League, it was announced that the season would be expanded to 10 games. In addition, the Boston Blazers announced their new home in the Fleet Center for 1996. Another big crowd of 16,818, the fourth largest in league history, watched the Wings defeat the Charlotte Cobras at CoreStates Spectrum in Philadelphia. The Wings advanced to their fifth consecutive league championship game by defeating the Boston Blazers, 10–8, a week before. That was the final MILL game to be played in the historic arena.

However, the Buffalo Bandits played spoiler to the Wings, and denied them a third consecutive league championship, as Buffalo beat Philadelphia, 15–10, in the 1996 league championship game, in front of a sold-out Memorial Auditorium in Buffalo. The Bandits picked up their third championship win, and said goodbye to their own arena, at the culmination of the season.

1997

The 11th season opened with three games, including Rochester playing Buffalo at the Bandits' new home, the Marine Midland Arena, in front of a new league record crowd of 18,595 fans. The Knighthawks of Rochester, coached by Barry Powless, later claimed their first MILL championship title in 1997, in front of the second largest crowd in MILL history, 18,055, also played at the Marine Midland Arena.

National Lacrosse League

In 1997, the Major Indoor Lacrosse League was reconstituted with a new name, the National Lacrosse League. Two expansion teams, the Syracuse Smash and Ontario Raiders, joined the previous MILL teams. John Livsey, Jr. was named as the first Commissioner of the National Lacrosse League.

1998

The 1998 regular season schedule was announced with teams now playing 12 games (six at home and six on the road) and facing their six opponents twice during the regular season (once at home and once on the road). In addition, the playoff format saw a best-of-three championship series with semifinal playoff action still taking place in a single-game elimination format, though sites of all post-season games were based on regular season record.

A blockbuster trade saw seven-time All-Pro Paul Gait go to the expansion Syracuse Smash in exchange for draft picks and player compensation. Reigning league MVP Gary Gait was sent to Baltimore in a blockbuster trade involving player and cash compensation.

The Philadelphia Wings swept the best-of-three Championship Series with a 17–12 win over the Thunder after having won 16–12 two days earlier. The second game marked the first title game appearance by Baltimore since 1991, and the win was Philadelphia's fifth in franchise history. Wings goaltender Dallas Eliuk was named Championship Series MVP.

1999

The Toronto Rock finished the season with a perfect home record, going a combined 8–0 (regular season and playoffs) after a 13–10 win over the Rochester Knighthawks in the Championship Game before a sellout crowd of 15,691 in Maple Leaf Gardens. The game was televised throughout Canada by CTV SportsNet, and in the United States on ESPN2.

2000

18,911 fans packed the First Union Center in Philadelphia to watch the Philadelphia Wings battle the Pittsburgh CrosseFire. Pittsburgh won the game, 14–8. At the time, this was the largest single-game crowd to ever see a professional box lacrosse game.

Kaleb Toth beat K-Hawks goaltender Pat O'Toole with 1.1 seconds remaining in regulation time to give the Toronto Rock a 14–13 victory, and their second straight championship. Considered to be among the best lacrosse games ever played, the 2000 Final was the last sporting event to be held in the historic Maple Leaf Gardens.

The city of Columbus, Ohio was granted an expansion team. Former League Commissioner John Livsey lead the Landsharks.

At a press conference at the ESPNZone in New York City, Jim Jennings was named the new Commissioner of the National Lacrosse League. Jennings announced that league headquarters would be relocated from Buffalo, New York, to Lyndhurst, New Jersey. Commissioner Jim Jennings appointed George Daniel to the position of Deputy Commissioner and General Counsel for the NLL.

2001

In front of the league's largest crowd in history, the Philadelphia Wings won their sixth League Championship Title with a 9–8 win over the Toronto Rock at the Air Canada Centre in front of 19,409 fans. Wings goaltender Dallas Eliuk was named Most Valuable Player.

The league announced that expansion franchises were awarded to Montreal, New Jersey, Calgary and Vancouver for the following season.

2002

The Vancouver Ravens played their inaugural home game at General Motors Place in Vancouver. The Ravens gave the crowd of 13,772 much to cheer about, beating the Toronto Rock 13–12. The crowd made history as the largest ever to attend the first home game of an expansion franchise.

The Albany Attack hosted the Toronto Rock in the 2002 Final. The Rock defeated the Attack by a score of 13–12 to capture their third title, all won in the past four seasons. 9,289 fans watched the game at the Pepsi Arena in Albany. Toronto forward Colin Doyle was voted Championship Game MVP, scoring three goals and one assist.

The league announced the sale and relocation of the Washington Power franchise to the city of Denver, Colorado, with the franchise playing its home games at Pepsi Center. The team was then owned by Kroenke Sports Enterprises, whose holdings include the Colorado Avalanche, Denver Nuggets and Pepsi Center. The new team marked the league's first U.S. team from west of the Mississippi River.

2003

The Colorado Mammoth played their inaugural home game at Pepsi Center in Denver. The Mammoth treated the home crowd of 16,121 fans to a thrilling 13–12 win in double overtime against the Toronto Rock. The crowd broke the previous record for an inaugural home game attendance, previously held by the Vancouver Ravens (13,772 in 2001).

In front of a sellout crowd of 18,207 at Pepsi Center, the Colorado Mammoth defeated the New York Saints by a score of 19–13. The crowd was the first of two sellout crowds the Mammoth would host during their first season.

The Rochester Knighthawks hosted the Toronto Rock in the 2003 Champion's Cup Final. The Rock defeated the Knighthawks by a score of 8–6 to capture their fourth title, all won in the past five seasons. 11,051 fans attended the game at the Blue Cross Arena in Rochester. Toronto goalie Bob Watson earned Championship Game MVP honors with his 40 saves.

2004

A new divisional format was announced for the regular season. The first-ever Western Division consisted of Anaheim, Arizona, Calgary, Colorado, San Jose, and Vancouver. The East consisted of Buffalo, Philadelphia, Rochester, and Toronto. The top three teams in each division would earn playoff berths with the division champions receiving byes. The second and third-place finishers would face each other in the opening round with the winners facing their respective division champions in the semi-final round. The semi-final winners (East vs. West) would meet in the 2004 Champions' Cup Final with the higher seed hosting.

Fox Sports Net became the league's new national broadcast partner in the United States. Fox Sports Net carried nine regular-season game broadcasts spread across the schedule to over 50 million homes. Fox Sports Net featured the 2004 All-Star Game on February 22, 2004. The Arizona Sting played their inaugural home game at the Glendale Arena in Arizona. The game became the first event ever held inside the new arena. The Sting defeated the Vancouver Ravens by a score of 16–12 in front of 12,789 fans.

The Colorado Mammoth hosted a sellout crowd of 18,305 at Pepsi Center in a 14–13 loss to the Calgary Roughnecks. The Mammoth went on to record five sellout crowds on the season.

The 2004 All-Star Game was played in front of 16,742 fans at Pepsi Center in Denver, home of the Colorado Mammoth. The crowd was the largest All-Star Game crowd in league history. The East Division All-Stars defeated the West Division All-Stars by a score of 19–15.

The Calgary Roughnecks won their first ever Champion's Cup by defeating the Buffalo Bandits 14–11 at Pengrowth Saddledome in Calgary. The game was played in front of 19,289 fans. The sellout crowd was the largest in Roughnecks history and the second highest single game attendance total in NLL history.

2005

The National Lacrosse League reached a new 3-year Collective Bargaining Agreement with the Professional Lacrosse Player's Association (PLPA). The agreement covers the league's 2005, 2006, and 2007 seasons.

The league announced the placement of a franchise in Minnesota. The new team would be owned and operated by Minnesota Sports and Entertainment, owners of the Minnesota Wild of the National Hockey League. The Minnesota team entered the league for the 2005 season and played its home games at the Xcel Energy Center in St. Paul.

A new preseason attendance record was set as 14,084 fans come to the Xcel Energy Center in St. Paul for the first home exhibition game of the expansion Minnesota Swarm. The game marked the first professional lacrosse game ever played in the state of Minnesota.

The National Lacrosse League All-Star Game aired live on NBC at 2 PM Eastern. The game became the first live broadcast of lacrosse on national U.S. network television. The game was also televised in Canada on The Score, and internationally via CNBC International, CNBC Asia, and on Armed Forces Network. The East Division (Buffalo, Minnesota, Philadelphia, Rochester, and Toronto) defeated the West Division (Anaheim, Arizona, Calgary, Colorado, and San Jose) 11–10 in overtime in front of 11,511 fans at Pengrowth Saddledome in Calgary.

Legendary lacrosse superstars and twin brothers Paul and Gary Gait were reunited when Paul ended his retirement signing with the Colorado Mammoth. Paul Gait joined his brother, Mammoth captain Gary, for the remaining four games of the regular season and the team's playoff run. He made his Mammoth debut on April 1, 2005, at Minnesota and then returned to Denver for the team's final regular-season home game on April 2, 2005, against the Anaheim Storm at Pepsi Center.

The 2005 Edge NLL Championship Game was played in front of an NLL record 19,432 fans at the Air Canada Centre in Toronto, Ontario, Canada, and in front of a national network television audience in the US on NBC and in Canada on the Score. The Toronto Rock defeated the Arizona Sting 19–13, capturing their fifth title in seven seasons. Colin Doyle was named MVP of the game after leading the Rock with five goals and three assists.

Legendary coach Les Bartley died after an 18-month battle with colon cancer. Bartley served as Head Coach and General Manager of the Toronto Rock between 1999 and 2003. He posted a 51–19 regular season record and 9–1 post-season record in five seasons. He also led the team to a 37–5 regular season home record in the same time. Bartley began his coaching career in 1991 and would go on to lead his teams to 11 Championship games, winning seven League Championships (four of those seven were with the Rock: back-to-back titles in 1999–2000 and 2002–2003). Prior to coming to Toronto, Bartley coached the Bandits to titles in 1992, 1993, and 1996.

The NLL announced that the league would consist of 11 teams for the 2006 season adding expansion teams in Edmonton, Alberta, and Portland, Oregon.

The league announced the establishment of the National Lacrosse League Hall of Fame. The Hall of Fame opened with five charter members who made immeasurable contributions to the league and the sport of lacrosse. The first five charter members awarded were league founders, Russ Cline and Chris Fritz; legendary lacrosse stars, Gary Gait and Paul Gait; and the late Les Bartley, the coach with the most wins in league history.

The NLL and Reebok announced a multi-year exclusive partnership in which all NLL players would use Reebok equipment and would be exclusively outfitted in the brand's footwear and apparel. The partnership made the brand the official equipment, uniform, and footwear provider of the league. The agreement made Reebok the exclusive licensee of official NLL apparel including authentic and replica jerseys, caps, shirts, and additional clothing.

2006

The Edmonton Rush played their inaugural game and home opener in front of 11,385 fans at Rexall Place in Edmonton, Alberta. The Rush lost 10–9 in overtime to the San Jose Stealth. The game was only the second time in league history that an expansion team forced overtime in their inaugural game.

The 2006 National Lacrosse League All-Star Game was held at the Air Canada Centre in Toronto, Ontario, home of the Toronto Rock. The West Division (Arizona Sting, Calgary Roughnecks, Colorado Mammoth, Edmonton Rush, Portland LumberJax, and San Jose Stealth) defeated the East Division (Buffalo Bandits, Minnesota Swarm, Philadelphia Wings, Rochester Knighthawks, and Toronto Rock) by a score of 14–13 in front of 15,924 fans. Calgary Roughnecks forward Lewis Ratcliff scored the game-winning goal with 4.4 seconds remaining. Ratcliff was named the Game MVP.

The National Lacrosse League finished its 20th season by setting an all-time single season attendance mark, reaching a total of 1,037,147 fans for the 2006 season, including 88 regular-season games, six playoff games, the 2006 All-Star Game in Toronto, and the 2006 RBK NLL Championship Game presented by Edge Active Care. The league season average attendance was 10,804.

The Colorado Mammoth defeated the Buffalo Bandits 16–9 in front of 16,104 fans at HSBC Arena in Buffalo to secure the first championship in Colorado Mammoth history. Mammoth forward Gavin Prout was named game MVP, scoring four goals and adding three assists for seven points in the win.

The National Lacrosse League announced the awarding of a franchise to New York City for the 2007 season. The official announcement was made during a press conference at East River Park in Manhattan by New York City Mayor Michael Bloomberg and National Lacrosse League Commissioner Jim Jennings. The New York team became the league's 13th franchise and would play its games at Madison Square Garden.

2007

The expansion New York Titans played their home opener at Madison Square Garden in the first ever professional lacrosse game at the "World's Most Famous Arena". The Titans defeated the expansion Chicago Shamrox 11–9 in front of 13,127 fans.

The Eastern Division defeated the Western Division 20–16 in front of 12,856 fans at Rose Garden in Portland, Oregon, home of the Portland LumberJax, in the 2007 National Lacrosse League All-Star Game. Buffalo Bandits forward Mark Steenhuis was named the game's Most Valuable Player becoming the first player in NLL history to win two All-Star Game MVP honors. Steenhuis had previously won the award in 2004.

The NLL reached a milestone as the league plays its 1,000th regular season game. The Minnesota Swarm hosted the Colorado Mammoth at Xcel Energy Center in Minneapolis/St Paul in the historic game. The Mammoth beat the Swarm 11–9.

The Rochester Knighthawks defeated the Arizona Sting, 13–11, in the 2007 NLL Championship presented by Edge Active Care at Jobing.com Arena. John Grant was named Championship Game MVP with a three-goal/five-assist performance. The victory marked the first time that Rochester had won the title since 1997.

The NLL reached a new seven-year agreement with the players' union.

2008

The league announced the divisional alignments for the 2008 regular season. The expansion Boston franchise would join the Eastern Division, expanding to eight teams: Boston, Buffalo, Chicago, Minnesota, New York, Philadelphia, Rochester, and Toronto. The Western Division composed of six teams remained unchanged: Arizona, Calgary, Colorado, Edmonton, Portland, and San Jose.

John Tavares broke Gary Gait's all-time goal scoring record. Tavares, who had already captured the all-time points and assists records, notched his record-breaking 597th career goal in the third quarter of Buffalo's 17–13 victory over New York. Philadelphia Forward Athan Iannucci broke Gary Gait's single season scoring record of 61 goals. He went on to finish the season with 71 goals.

The Buffalo Bandits defeated the Portland LumberJax by the score of 14–13 in the 2008 Edge NLL Championship game at HSBC Arena. The event, which aired nationally on ESPN2, drew a sellout crowd of 18,690 fans. Mark Steenhuis captured the game's MVP honors with five goals and one assist.

2009

The league announced the addition of instant replay for officials to review disputed goals and crease violations during games. George Daniel was appointed Commissioner of the National Lacrosse League. Calgary won its second championship, defeating New York 12–10 in front of a crowd of 13,042 at Pengrowth Saddledome. Josh Sanderson was named Championship Game MVP, finishing with two goals and three assists.

2010

The Washington Stealth won its first championship, defeating the Toronto Rock 15–11 in front of a crowd of 8,609 at Comcast Arena. Lewis Ratcliff was named Championship Game MVP.

2011

The Toronto Rock won its record sixth championship, tying the Philadelphia Wings, by defeating the Washington Stealth 8–7 in front of a crowd of 8,609 at Air Canada Centre. Bob Watson was named Championship Game MVP.

2012

The Rochester Knighthawks won its third championship, defeating the Edmonton Rush 9–6 in front of a crowd of 9,277 at Blue Cross Arena. Cody Jamieson was named Championship Game MVP.

2013

The Rochester Knighthawks won its fourth championship, defeating the Washington Stealth 11–10 in front of a crowd of 5,200 at Langley Events Centre. Cody Jamieson was named Championship Game MVP.

2014

The Rochester Knighthawks won its fifth championship, defeating Calgary Roughnecks 2–1. Game 1 was a 7–11 victory for the Roughnecks in front of a crowd of 16,541 at Scotiabank Saddledome. The Knighthawks won game 2, 16–10, and clinched game 3, 3–2, in front of a crowd of 9,188 at Blue Cross Arena. Dan Dawson was named Championship Game MVP.

2015

The Edmonton Rush won its first championship, defeating the Toronto Rock 2–0. The Rush won game 1, 15–9 in front of a crowd of 9,257 at Air Canada Centre. Game 2 was an 11–10 victory in front of a crowd of 12,275 at Rexall Place. Mark Matthews was named Championship Game MVP.

2016

Nick Sakiewicz was appointed the 5th Commissioner of the National Lacrosse League.

The Saskatchewan Rush won its second championship, defeating the Buffalo Bandits 2–0. Game 1 finished 11–9, in front of a crowd of 12,692 at First Niagara Center. Game 2 finished 11–10 in front of a crowd of 15,182 at SaskTel Centre. Aaron Bold was named Championship Game MVP.

2017

The Georgia Swarm won its first championship, defeating the Saskatchewan Rush 2–0. Game 1 was an 18–14 result in front of a crowd of 7,642 at Infinite Energy Arena. Game 2 finished 15–14 in front of a crowd of 14,264 at SaskTel Centre. Lyle Thompson was named Championship Game MVP.

2018

2019

The 2019 NLL season was delayed when the Professional Lacrosse Players Association went on strike shortly before training camp was to begin. On November 15, 2018, the league announced that a counter-proposal submitted by the Professional Lacrosse Players Association was rejected. This came after the league suspended their Wednesday, November 14 deadline to review the counter-proposal. Subsequently, the league announced that all games to be played in the first two weeks of the season (encompassing December 1 and 8 weekends) were canceled.NLL scraps first two weeks of the season – TSN.ca

On November 24, the NLL and the PLPA reached a new five-year collective bargaining agreement. The first week of the season began on December 15 and the league announced each team will still play the standard 18 game schedule. The league kicked off its first game of the season on December 15, with the Wings returning to Philadelphia. The Wings fell to the visiting Buffalo Bandits, 17–15 On December 22, the San Diego Seals played their first ever game, upsetting the Colorado Mammoth at the Pepsi Center, 17–12.

2020

On September 13, 2018, the Rochester Knighthawks announced that they would re-locate to Halifax, Nova Scotia for the 2020 season, as the NLL's fifth Canadian franchise. Pegula Sports and Entertainment was subsequently awarded a new expansion franchise in Rochester, which would also be known as the Rochester Knighthawks after acquiring rights to its name and branding. The original Knighthawks' records would remain with the Halifax-based team, which would become the Halifax Thunderbirds. In December 2018, another new expansion team in Long Island, later named the New York Riptide, was announced for the 2020 season under the ownership of Gary Fuhrman, which would play at the Nassau Veterans Memorial Coliseum. After a fan vote, the new team was named the New York Riptide.

On March 13, 2020, league play was indefinitely suspended due to the COVID-19 pandemic. On June 4, 2020, the league announced that the 2020 playoffs were canceled due to the pandemic.  Even though there were scenarios to have a shortened playoff tournament, the league decided to focus on the 2021 season instead. In July 2020, a new expansion team was awarded to Fort Worth, Texas. Bill Cameron will be the majority owner while Greg Bibb will serve as managing partner of the team.

2021 
On February 3, 2021, the 2021 season was canceled due to logistical issues and uncertainties, including new Canadian travel restrictions requiring hotel quarantine. The NLL stated that it planned to focus on the 2022 season instead.

2022

The 2022 season began on December 3, 2021 and ended with the Colorado Mammoth defeating the Buffalo Bandits on June 18, 2022. This was the inaugural season for the expansion team Panther City Lacrosse Club, and the Albany FireWolves who relocated from New England.

2023

The 2023 season is scheduled to begin on December 2, 2022, and ends with the NLL final in late spring of 2023. This is the inaugural season for the expansion team Las Vegas Desert Dogs. The 2023 NLL Stadium Showdown, the first outdoor NLL game, was held on March 4 at Snapdragon Stadium, between the Las Vegas Desert Dogs and the San Diego Seals.

Commissioners

Championship history

Expansion and relocation
In July 2007, the Vancouver Ravens were conditionally approved for a 2008 return; the conditions included selling at least 2,500 season tickets and finding a suitable arena lease by July 19, 2007. On July 16, 2007, the Vancouver Ravens announced an agreement with Orca Bay Sports and Entertainment to make GM Place (now Rogers Arena) the home venue of the Ravens, if they were able to meet the season ticket sales requirement. However, just a few days later, announced that the Ravens would not play in the 2008 season. Although a local tabloid made mention of a potential return in 2011 for the team, Commissioner Daniel announced that there would be no expansion in 2011.

A number of cities and potential ownership groups have expressed interest in expansion franchises:

After high attendance of over 20,000 fans at the 2007 World Indoor Lacrosse Championship in Halifax, Nova Scotia, Jennings says that the league will "definitely consider expanding to Halifax, for sure."
 
On June 17, 2009, the San Jose Stealth announced their relocation to Everett, Washington, north of Seattle, for the 2010 season. The newly renamed Washington Stealth played their home games at the Comcast Arena at Everett. In their first season in Everett, the Stealth won the league title.

On August 10, 2009, the New York Titans announced the team's move to Orlando, Florida, to become the Orlando Titans.

Commissioner George Daniel announced on March 31, 2010, that there would be no expansion for the 2011 season.

In July 2010, the Orlando Titans announced that they would not participate in the 2011 season due to ownership restructuring.

In late summer 2011, the Boston Blazers suspended operations for the 2012 season. However, as of May 31, 2012, GM and team president Doug Reffue stated that the Blazers ownership is in negotiations with a local New England group. With the intentions of either selling the team or entering into a partnership with this group, Reffue added that the Blazers could return for the 2014 season.

On June 27, 2013, the Washington Stealth announced that they were relocating permanently to the Langley Events Centre in Langley, British Columbia, and would be renamed the Vancouver Stealth. The decision to relocate was made after the 2013 NLL Championship Game (which the Stealth earned the right to host) had to be moved, due to a scheduling conflict with Comcast Arena, from Everett to Langley, where it was played before a sold out crowd.

On July 11, 2014 the Philadelphia Wings announced they would be relocating from Philadelphia after 28 years in the city. On August 5, the Wings announced they would be relocating to Uncasville, Connecticut and will play in the Mohegan Sun Arena.

On May 29, 2015 the Minnesota Swarm announced they would be relocating to Duluth, Georgia to become the Georgia Swarm, and will play in the Arena at Gwinnett Center.

On July 20, 2015 the Edmonton Rush announced they would be relocating to Saskatoon, Saskatchewan to become the Saskatchewan Rush and play in the SaskTel Centre.  In their first season in Saskatoon, the Rush won the league title.

On August 30, 2017, the NLL announced a new franchise for San Diego to begin play in the 2018–19 schedule.  The San Diego Seals are owned by Joseph Tsai.  Two weeks later on September 14, the league announced an eleventh franchise also to begin play in 2018–19, the return of the league to Philadelphia which has been without a team since the Philadelphia Wings moved to New England in the summer of 2014.  The new Wings will be owned by Comcast Spectacor though it is yet to be determined if the original history will belong to the new incarnation.

On September 13, 2018, the NLL announced that the Rochester Knighthawks would re-locate to Halifax, Nova Scotia as the Halifax Thunderbirds, and that a new iteration of the Nighthawks would be established as an expansion franchise under the ownership of Pegula Sports and Entertainment. The Thunderbirds' owner Curt Styres sold the rights to the Knighthawks' intellectual property to Pegula. On December 11, 2018, the NLL announced a new expansion franchise in Long Island, New York, slated to play at the Nassau Coliseum. After a public vote, the team announced its branding as the New York Riptide in February 2019.

On July 22, 2020, the league announced it would expand to Fort Worth, Texas for the 2021–22 season, playing its home games at Dickies Arena. This team became the Panther City Lacrosse Club.

On February 23, 2021, the league announced the relocation of the New England Black Wolves to Albany, New York beginning in the 2021–22 season. The Albany FireWolves team will play at the Times Union Center and were officially named the FireWolves on April 14, 2021 after an online naming contest was held.

Name changes
 Baltimore Thunder (1987–1999) → Pittsburgh CrosseFire (2000) → Washington Power (2001–2002) → Colorado Mammoth (2002–current)
 New Jersey Saints (1987–1988) → New York Saints (1989–2003) → Inactive
 New England Blazers (1989–1991) → Boston Blazers (1992–1997) → Inactive
 Ontario Raiders (1998) → Toronto Rock (1999–current)
 Syracuse Smash (1998–2000) → Ottawa Rebel (2000–2003) → Inactive (2003–2005) → Edmonton Rush (2005–2015) → Saskatchewan Rush (2015–current)
 Albany Attack (1999–2003) → San Jose Stealth (2003–2009) → Washington Stealth (2009–2013) → Vancouver Stealth (2013–2018) → Vancouver Warriors (2018–current)
 Columbus Landsharks (2001–2003) → Arizona Sting (2003–2007) → Inactive
 Montreal Express (2002) → Inactive → Minnesota Swarm (2004–2015) → Georgia Swarm (2015–current)
 New Jersey Storm (2002–2003) → Anaheim Storm (2003–2005) → Inactive
 Philadelphia Wings (1987–2014) → New England Black Wolves (2014–2021) → Albany FireWolves (2021–current)
 Rochester Knighthawks (1995–2019) → Halifax Thunderbirds (2019–current)

Franchise Timeline by Location

Professional Lacrosse Players' Association

The Professional Lacrosse Players' Association (PLPA) is the trade union of players in the NLL. The PLPA was founded in 1991 by Dave Succamore (a former Detroit Turbos  player), Peter Schmitz (a former Boston Blazers player and president) and four other players from other teams with assistance by labor attorney Ronald L. Jaros. The union was organized to assist with missed work pay for players who miss their regular jobs for games; expanded expense reimbursement; more opportunities for promotional pay on top of their regular game salaries; more time for rookies to assess their initial contracts; game compensation for practice players; free agency; a standard grievance and arbitration process for fines and suspensions. Before the PLPA was in place, injured players were responsible for paying their own medical bills.

Media coverage
In the early 2000s, CNN Sports Illustrated aired NLL games regularly. The NLL had had its All-Star Games and Championship games on NBC in 2005 and ESPN2 in 2006.

In 2007, the NLL had a regularly scheduled "Game of the Week" on Versus. For the 2008 season, due to dispute between the Professional Lacrosse Players' Association and the NLL owners in completing the collective bargaining agreement, the "Game of the Week" on Versus was cancelled. Also in 2007, the NLL signed an agreement with Sirius Satellite Radio, who were the "Official Satellite Radio Partner". The pact included a "Game of the Week" as well as a weekly highlight show.

For the 2011 season, the NLL returned to Versus, beginning with coverage of the 2011 All-Star Game, followed by 6 weekly games, and 2 playoff games, one of these being the championship game. In the 2012 season, the rights shifted to CBS Sports Network, which carried a package of eight regular season games.

In 2012, the NLL reached an agreement with the YouTube channel The Lacrosse Network. All games were available on YouTube after the broadcast and most games were broadcast live. For the 2016 season, the league moved to Fox Sports' streaming platform Fox Sports Go. Beginning with the 2016 division semifinals, the NLL introduced an in-house NLLTV service operated by NeuLion.

In the 2017 season, the NLL reached a two-season deal with Twitter to stream a weekly game, as well as playoff games and the Champion's Cup, via the social network's live streaming features. A separate deal was reached with CBS Sports Digital to stream games on its subscription platform SportsLive.

For the 2018–19 season, the league announced a broadcasting agreement with Turner Sports, under which its games would be streamed exclusively by B/R Live. 

For the 2021–22 season, the NLL reached a new media rights agreement with ESPN Inc., under which all games would stream on ESPN+ in the United States, and at least 10 would air on an ESPN television channel. In Canada, the league also returned to TSN (which is minority-owned by ESPN) for the first time since 2016, airing a Saturday-night package focusing on its Canadian franchises, playoff games, and streaming of other games online for TSN subscribers. All other game broadcasts are produced in-house by the league, using a mix of on-site staff and remote production hubs (with Dome Productions, a joint venture between TSN's parent company Bell Media and rival Rogers Media, handling the hub for Canadian teams and any other game broadcast by TSN).

Video games
Blast Lacrosse, a video game based on the NLL, was released on May 23, 2001. Developed by Sandbox Studios and published by Acclaim Entertainment, it was the first lacrosse video game and included all nine teams from the NLL's 15th season (2001). The game received a 6.1/10 score from IGNs Chris Carle, who praised the gameplay and controls but criticized the graphics and animations of the players.

On February 15, 2005, the NLL announced that Activision would produce a new video game. The game was slated to be released for the 2007 season. In an online chat held on NLL.com with commissioner Jim Jennings, it was noted that the game would be out in 2009, but the game was never released.

On March 31, 2010, the NLL announced it had partnered with Crosse Studio and Triple B Games to develop NLL Lacrosse 2010 presented by Reebok Lacrosse. The game was released exclusively on the Xbox 360 as an Indie Game on April 23, 2010. Crosse Studio and Triple B Games developed Inside Lacrosse's College Lacrosse 2010 in 2009 before approaching the NLL to license their next game. The NLL game won Kotaku's Indie Sports video game of the year for 2010.

Awards
National Lacrosse League Weekly Awards
National Lacrosse League Monthly Awards
MVP Award
Rookie of the Year Award
Les Bartley Award (coach of the year)
GM of the Year Award
Executive of the Year Award
Defensive Player of the Year Award
Transition Player of the Year Award
Goaltender of the Year Award
Sportsmanship Award
Tom Borrelli Award (writer of the year)

See also
 Major Series Lacrosse, Senior A box league in Ontario, Canada
 Western Lacrosse Association, Senior A box league in British Columbia, Canada
 Interstate Box Lacrosse Association, semi-professional box league in the United States
 Premier Lacrosse League, professional men's field lacrosse league in North America
 Major League Lacrosse, professional men's field lacrosse league in North America
 United Women's Lacrosse League, a professional women's field lacrosse league in North America
 Women's Professional Lacrosse League, a professional women's field lacrosse league in North America
 List of professional sports teams in the United States and Canada
 Professional sports leagues in the United States
 List of National Lacrosse League venues

Notes

References

External links

 
 Professional Lacrosse Players' Association official website

 
Sports leagues established in 1987
Sports leagues in the United States
Professional sports leagues in Canada
Professional sports leagues in the United States
Multi-national professional sports leagues
1987 establishments in Pennsylvania